Ellsworth USD 327 is a public unified school district headquartered in Ellsworth, Kansas, United States.  The district includes the communities of Ellsworth, Kanopolis, Geneseo, Carneiro, Yankee Run, Black Wolf, and nearby rural areas.

History
School unification consolidated Ellsworth, Geneseo, and Kanopolis schools into USD 327.

Schools
The school district operates the following schools:
 Ellsworth Junior/Senior High School
 Kanopolis Middle School
 Ellsworth Elementary School

Clubs and organizations at the Junior Senior High include Future Farmers America, National Honor Society, Art Club, Band and flags, the Student Council, Ellsworth Singers, the Choir and Spanish Club.

Senior high sports include football, cross country, girls' basketball, softball, volleyball, wrestling, track and field, baseball, cheerleading and girls' tennis.

Junior high school sports include football, wrestling, track and field, cheerleading, cross country and volleyball, boys as well as girls may also play basketball.

See also
 Kansas State Department of Education
 Kansas State High School Activities Association
 List of high schools in Kansas
 List of unified school districts in Kansas

References

External links
 

School districts in Kansas